Tai Po Democratic Alliance is a loose political alliance consisting of the 17 candidates in the 2019 District Council election for the Tai Po District Council. With the pro-democracy camp winning all the elected seats in the election, the alliance also saw 16 of its candidates being elected. While four of them ran under the banner of the alliance, the others ran either with their own political groups or as independents.

History
The pro-democracy camp controlled six seats in the Tai Po District Council before the 2019 District Council election. In order to maximise the pro-democratic forces, the incumbent District Councillors joined hand with eight other hopefuls to form the Tai Po Democratic Alliance.

The alliance had 17 members running in the election. While some candidates ran as members of Neo Democrats and Community Alliance, as well as independents, there were four members ran with under the banner of the alliance, including Lam Ming-yat in Tai Po Hui, Dalu Lin Kok-cheung in Kwong Fuk & Plover Cove, Patrick Mo Ka-chun in Tai Po Kau and "airport uncle" Richard Chan Chun-chit in Lam Tsuen Valley. All four candidates were elected with the pro-democrats took all 19 of the 19 elected seats in the council. Only alliance member Yam Man-chuen was unseated by another pro-democrat candidate Ho Wai-lam in Fu Heng, meaning the alliance unofficially winning a total number of 16 seats in total.

Performance in elections

Tai Po District Council elections

References

External links
Tai Po Democratic Alliance's facebook page

Political party alliances in Hong Kong
2019 establishments in Hong Kong
Liberal parties in Hong Kong
Political parties established in 2019